Sinai Temple (Hebrew: סִינַי) is a medium-sized Reform Jewish synagogue located in Springfield, Massachusetts, New England's fourth largest city (population 153,060).

Founded in 1931, Sinai was the first Reform congregation in Springfield. The congregation's first rabbi, David M. Eichhorn, was hired in 1932 and let go just two years later due to financial difficulty brought on by the Great Depression, though he went on to become a prominent American rabbi and authority on interfaith marriage and conversion for the Reform movement.

History
The congregation began meeting at a mansion at 188 Sumner Ave. in Springfield in 1932, which was used as a synagogue until the late 1940s. In 1949 Sinai broke ground on a new location at 1100 Dickinson Street, near the Longmeadow border, which was completed in 1950. Notably, Sinai has had two long-tenured rabbis: Herman E. Snyder (1947–1970) and Mark D. Shapiro (1988–2016). Membership grew from 50 to 500 families under Rabbi Snyder's leadership. An interfaith leader, he created the Sinai Temple Institute for Christian and Muslim Clergy and Educators, an annual learning session that brings together clergy from the three major religions for a seminar at the Temple.

Rabbi Snyder's successor, Bernard Cohen, was the first rabbi to serve on the faculty of a Roman Catholic college (Saint Mary-of-the-Woods College). His 1970 installation was attended by 100 Catholic and Protestant clergymen.

Rabbinical leadership

Prominent alumni
Eric Lesser, Massachusetts State Senator

References

External links 
 Official Website

Religious buildings and structures in Springfield, Massachusetts
Reform synagogues in Massachusetts
Buildings and structures in Springfield, Massachusetts
Jewish organizations established in 1931
Synagogues completed in 1950